Whigfield III is the third studio album by Italian Eurodance project Whigfield performed by Danish-born model Sannie Charlotte Carlson, released on October 10, 2000.

Track list
Be My Baby
Much More
Unbelievable
Lost in You
Makin' My Day
Outside
Upon A Star
All Your Love
Mi Amor
Waitin' For Saturday
Doo-Whop (ABM Edit)
Whigfield Megamix (Think of You/Another Day/Saturday Night/Sexy Eyes/Be My Baby)

References

External links

2000 albums
Whigfield albums